Stjepan Ljubić (11 August 1906 – 14 August 1986) was a Yugoslav cyclist. He competed in the individual and team road race events at the 1928 Summer Olympics. He also rode in the 1936 Tour de France.

References

External links
 

1906 births
1986 deaths
People from Virje
People from the Kingdom of Croatia-Slavonia
Yugoslav male cyclists
Olympic cyclists of Yugoslavia
Cyclists at the 1928 Summer Olympics